Capital Theatre (kAp-uh-tl thEE-uh-tuhr) is a Rock band based in New Zealand made up of vocalist, pianist, and guitarist, Adam Stevenson, vocalist and guitarist, Roy Oliver, and vocalist and drummer, Paul Reid.

Career

Beginnings and Formation 
Stevenson, Oliver, and Reid met at a band jam night called Sing Sing at the Pony Club, a disguised, underground gentlemen's club. The owner, Brooke Howard-Smith, established the club in 2007 in Auckland, NZ as a space for concerts he was hosting. The venue received criticism in the press including “a decrepit cesspool” and a “70s porn den”.

“A Hero’s Journey” Album 
The band started recording their original songs in early 2020 with Guns N Roses music producer, Mike Clink, out of NRG Studios in Los Angeles. Due to the Covid-19 shutdown, they were forced to relocate back to New Zealand where, after a six week lockdown, they reconnected with Clink virtually, and worked remotely out of Neil Finn’s Roundhead Studios using FaceTime and a live audio stream. The band finished the recording process and released the single, “Force To Fight”, on November 3rd of the same year. 

Since then, they released four additional singles off the album, one of which (titled "Delicately Poised"), they shot a music video for in Barcelona due to New Zealand being under lockdown restrictions. The video was shot at the underground adult entertainment club, Bagdad, while the band recorded their part back at home in New Zealand. The footage was merged together to create the final video, which was co-directed by the band, along with Bruno Amaral Pereira and Julie Gomez of Kalapa Studios, and Alex Hargreaves (responsible for shooting the New Zealand footage). 

Capital Theatre is signed to Reslau Records.

Discography

References

New Zealand rock music groups